Abū Muḥammad ʿAlī ibn Aḥmad ibn Saʿīd ibn Ḥazm (also sometimes known as al-Andalusī aẓ-Ẓāhirī; 7 November 994 – 15 August 1064 [456 AH]) was an Arab Andalusian Muslim polymath, historian, muhaddith, jurist, philosopher, and theologian, born in the Caliphate of Córdoba, present-day Spain. Described as one of the strictest hadith interpreters, Ibn Hazm was a leading proponent and codifier of the Zahiri school of Islamic thought and produced a reported 400 works, of which only 40 still survive. In all, his written works amounted to some 80 000 pages. Described as one of the fathers of comparative religion, the Encyclopaedia of Islam refers to him as having been one of the leading thinkers of the Muslim world.

Personal life

Lineage
Ibn Hazm's grandfather Sa'id and his father, Ahmad, both held high advisory positions in the court of Umayyad Caliph Hisham II. Scholars believe that they were Iberian Christians who converted to Islam.

Upbringing
Having been raised in a politically and economically important family, Ibn Hazm mingled with people of power and influence all his life. He had access to levels of government by his adolescence that most people then would never know throughout their whole lives. Those experiences with government and politicians caused Ibn Hazm to develop a reluctant and even sad skepticism about human nature and the capacity of human beings to deceive and to oppress.

His reaction was to believe that there was no refuge or truth except with an infallible God and that with men resided only corruption. He was thus known for his cynicism regarding humanity and a strong respect for the principles of language and sincerity in communication.

Career
Ibn Hazm lived among the circle of the ruling hierarchy of the Caliphate of Córdoba government. His experiences produced an eager and observant attitude, and he gained an excellent education at Córdoba. 

After the death of the grand vizier, al-Muzaffar, in 1008, the Caliphate of Iberia became embroiled in a civil war that lasted until 1031 and resulted in its collapse of the central authority of Córdoba and the emergence of many smaller incompetent states, the taifas.

Ibn Hazm's father died in 1012. Ibn Hazm was frequently imprisoned as a suspected supporter of the Umayyads. By 1031, Ibn Hazm retreated to his family estate at Manta Lisham and had begun to express his activist convictions in the literary form. He was a leading proponent and codifier of the Zahiri school of Islamic thought, and he produced a reported 400 works, but only 40 still survive. His political and religious opponents gained power after the collapse of the caliphate and so he accepted an offer of asylum from the governor of the island of Majorca in the 1040s. He continued to propagate the Zahiri School there before he returned to Andalusia.

Contemporaries coined the saying "the tongue of Ibn Hazm was a twin brother to the sword of al-Hajjaj", an infamous 7th century general and governor of Iraq. Ibn Hazm became so frequently quoted that the phrase "Ibn Hazm said" became proverbial.

As an Athari, he opposed the allegorical interpretation of religious texts and preferred a grammatical and syntactical interpretation of the Qur'an. He granted cognitive legitimacy only to revelation and sensation, and he considered deductive reasoning insufficient in legal and religious matters. He rejected practices common among more orthodox schools such as juristic discretion. He was initially a follower of the Maliki school of law within Sunni Islam, but he switched to the Shafi'i school at around the age of thirty. He finally settled with the Zahiri school. He is perhaps the most well-known adherent of the school and the main source of extant works on Zahirite law. He studied the school's precepts and methods under Abu al-Khiyar al-Dawudi al-Zahiri of Santarém Municipality and was eventually promoted to the level of a teacher of the school himself.

In 1029, both were expelled from the main mosque of Cordoba for their activities.

Works 

Much of Ibn Hazm's substantial body of works, which approached that of Muhammad ibn Jarir al-Tabari and As-Suyuti's, was burned in Seville by his sectarian and political opponents. His surviving works, while criticised as repetitive, didactic and abrasive in style, also show a fearless irreverence towards his academic critics and authorities.

Ibn Hazm wrote works on law and theology and over ten medical books. He called for science to be integrated into a standard curriculum. In Organization of the Sciences, he diachronically defines educational fields as stages of progressive acquisition set over a five-year curriculum, from language and exegesis of the Qur'an to the life and physical sciences to a rationalistic theology.

Apart from his rational works, Ibn Hazm's The Ring of the Dove (Tawq al-hamamah) is considered a major work of Arabic literature from Al-Andalus.

Detailed Critical Examination
In Fisal (Detailed Critical Examination), a treatise on Islamic science and theology, Ibn Hazm promoted sense perception above subjectively flawed human reason. Recognizing the importance of reason, as the Qur'an itself invites  reflection, he argued that reflection to refer mainly to revelation and sense data since the principles of reason are themselves derived entirely from sense experience. He concludes that reason is not a faculty for independent research or discovery, but that sense perception should be used in its place, an idea that forms the basis of empiricism.

Jurisprudence
Perhaps Ibn Hazm's most influential work in the Arabic, selections of which have been translated into English, is now The Muhalla (المحلى بالأثار), or The Adorned Treatise. It is reported to be a summary of a much longer work, known as Al-Mujalla (المجلى). Its essential focus is on matters of jurisprudence or fiqh (فقه), but it also touches of matters of creed in its first chapter, Kitab al-Tawheed (كتاب التوحيد), whose focus is on credal matters related to monotheism and the fundamental principles of approach to divine texts. One of the main points that emerges from the masterpiece of jurisprudencial thought is that Ibn Hazm rejects analogical reasoning (qiyas قياس) but prefers a far more direct and literal approach to the texts.

Logic
Ibn Hazm wrote the Scope of Logic, which stressed on the importance of sense perception as a source of knowledge. He wrote that the "first sources of all human knowledge are the soundly used senses and the intuitions of reason, combined with a correct understanding of a language". Ibn Hazm also criticized some of the more traditionalist theologians who were opposed to the use of logic and argued that the first generations of Muslims did not rely on logic. His response was that the early Muslims had witnessed the revelation directly, but later Muslims have been exposed to contrasting beliefs and so the use of logic is necessary to preserve the true teachings of Islam. The work was first republished in Arabic by Ihsan Abbas in 1959 and most recently by Abu Abd al-Rahman Ibn Aqil al-Zahiri in 2007.

Ethics
In his book, In Pursuit of Virtue, Ibn Hazm had urged his readers:
Do not use your energy except for a cause more noble than yourself. Such a cause cannot be found except in Almighty God Himself: to preach the truth, to defend womanhood, to repel humiliation which your creator has not imposed upon you, to help the oppressed. Anyone who uses his energy for the sake of the vanities of the world is like someone who exchanges gemstones for gravel.

Poetry
A poem or fragment of a poem by him is preserved in Ibn Said al-Maghribi's Pennants of the Champions:
You came to me just before
the Christians rang their bells.
The half-moon was rising
looking like an old man's eyebrow
or a delicate instep.

And although it was still night
when you came a rainbow
gleamed on the horizon,
showing as many colours
as a peacock's tail.

Medicine
Ibn Hazm's teachers in medicine included al-Zahrawi and Ibn al-Kattani, and he wrote ten medical works, including Kitab fi'l-Adwiya al-mufrada mentioned by al-Dhahabi.

Views

Language
In addition to his views on honesty in communication, Ibn Hazm also addressed the science of language to some degree. He viewed the Arabic language, the Hebrew language and the Syriac language as all essentially being one language which branched out as the speakers settled in different geographic regions and developed different vocabularies and grammars from the common root. He also differed with many Muslim theologians in that he did not view Arabic as superior to other languages since the Qur'an does not describe Arabic as such. Ibn Hazm viewed that there was no proof for claiming any language was superior to another.

Literalism
Ibn Hazm was well known for his strict literalism and is considered the champion of the literalist Zahirite school within Sunni Islām. A commonly-cited example is his interpretation of the first half of verse 23 in the Qur'anic chapter of Al-Isra prohibiting one from saying "uff" to one's parents. Ibn Hazm said that half of the verse prohibits only saying "uff", not hitting one's parents, for example. However, he considered that hitting them is prohibited by the second half of the verse as well as verse 24 which command kind treatment of parents.

Philosophy
Ibn Hazm's works lightly touched upon the traditions of Greek philosophy. Agreeing with both Epicurus and Prodicus of Ceos, he stated that pleasure brings happiness in life and that there is nothing to fear in death. He believed that these philosophical traditions were useful but not enough to build an individual's character properly, and he stated that the Islamic faith was also necessary.

The concept of absolute free will was rejected by Ibn Hazm, as he believed that all of an individual's attributes are created by God.

Shia
Ibn Hazm was highly critical of the Shia. He said about the sect:The Persians possessed a great kingdom and an upper hand above all other nations. They magnified the danger they posed [to others nations] by calling themselves al-Ahrār (the free ones) and al-Asyād (the noble ones). As a result, they considered all other people their slaves. However, they were afflicted with the destruction of their empire at the hands of the Arabs whom they had considered a lesser danger among the other nations [to their empire]. Their affairs became exacerbated and their afflictions doubled as they plotted wars against Islam various times. However, in all of their plots, Allāh made the Truth manifest. They continued to plot more useful stunts. So, some of their people accepted Islām only to turn towards Shī'ism, with the claim of loving Ahl al-Bayt (the family of the Prophet) and abhorrence to the oppression against 'Alī. Then, they traversed upon this way until it led them away from the path of Guidance [Islām].

Reception
Muslim scholars, especially those subscribing to Zahirism, have often praised Ibn Hazm for what they perceive as his knowledge and perseverance. Yemeni preacher Muqbil bin Hadi al-Wadi'i was one of Ibn Hazm's admirers in recent times, holding the view that no other Muslim scholar had embodied the prophetic tradition of the Muhammad and the Sahaba. On several occasions, al-Wadi'i rejected the validity of Qiyas while referencing Ibn Hazm's works. As a matter of fact, al-Wadi'i would at times advice his students to be Zahiri when approaching Fiqh altogether.  Similarly, Pakistani cleric Badi' ud-Din Shah al-Rashidi taught Ibn Hazm's book Al-Muhalla to students in Masjid al-Haram, while living in Mecca. al-Wadi'i himself taught Al-Muhalla in Al-Masjid an-Nabawi, while in Medina. Abu Abd al-Rahman Ibn Aqil al-Zahiri, the primary biographer of Ibn Hazm in the modern era, has authored a number of works on Ibn Hazm's life and career, many published through Ibn Aqil's printing press which is named after Ibn Hazm.

Modernist revival of Ibn Hazm's general critique of Islamic legal theory has seen several key moments in Arab intellectual history, including Ahmad Shakir's re-publishing of Al-Muhalla, Muhammad Abu Zahra's biography of Ibn Hazm, and the re-publishing of archived epistles on legal theory by Sa'id al-Afghani in 1960 and Ihsan Abbas between 1980 and 1983.

See also 
 Hazm (name)
 Miguel Asín Palacios

References

Sources
 The Ring of the Dove by Ibn Hazm, translation and preface by A. J. Arberry 
 al-Fasl fi al-milal wa-al-ahwa' wa-al-nihal, by Ibn Hazm. Bairut: Dar al-Jil, 1985
 Abenházam de Córdoba y su Historia crítica de las ideas religiosas vols. 1–5, by Miguel Asín Palacios. Madrid, 1928–1932
 Muslim writers on Judaism and the Hebrew Bible : from Ibn Rabban to Ibn Hazm, by Camilla Adang. Leiden: E.J. Brill, 1996. 
 Ibn Hazm et la polémique islamo-chrétienne dans l´histoire de l´Islam, by Abdelilah Ljamai. Leiden: Brill, 2003. 
 Ibn Hazam Khilal Alf Aam, by Abu Abd al-Rahman Ibn Aqil al-Zahiri. Lebanon: Dar al-Gharab al-Islami, 1982. 303 pages.
 Kitab al-'axlaq wa-s-siyar ou Risala fi mudawat an-nufus wa-tahdib al-'axlaq wa-z-zuhd fi r-rada'il / Ibn Hazm al-'Andalusi; introd., éd. critique, remarques par Eva Riad. Uppsala : Univ. ; Stockholm : Almqvist & Wiksell international (distr.), 1980. 
 The Zahiris, Their Doctrine and Their History: a contribution to the history of Islamic theology by Ignaz Goldziher, trans. and ed. Wolfgang Behn. Leiden: E.J. Brill, 1971.
 "Ibn Hazm of Cordova: on Porphyry's Isagoge", by Rafael Ramón Guerrero, in J. Meirinhos - O. Weijers (eds.): Florilegium mediaevale. Études offertes à Jacqueline Hamesse à l'occasion de son éméritat, Louvain-La-Neuve, FIDEM, 2009, pp. 525–540.

External links 

 Biodata at MuslimScholars.info

 The original Arabic manuscript of Tawq Alhamama
 Global webpost Ibn Hazm and female prophethood
 Muslim Heritage Biography
 Britannica.org Encyclopædia Britannica article on Ibn Hazm
 Polemics (Muslim-Jewish), Camilla Adang, Sabine Schmidtke: Andalusi Ibn Ḥazm, who was known for his rather indiscriminate vilification of opponents, even if they were Muslims., p. 6, in "Encyclopedia of Jews in the Islamic World", ed. Norman Stillman 
  The Position of Ibn Hazm about Asharism by at-tawhid.net

 
994 births
1064 deaths
Hazm
11th-century Muslim theologians
Critics of Shia Islam
Hadith scholars
Islamic philosophers
Mujaddid
People from Córdoba, Spain
Scholars from the Caliphate of Córdoba
Biographical evaluation scholars
Muwallads
Zahiris